Guoyue (國樂; literally "national music"; also minyue (民乐),  huayue (華樂) or zhongyue (中樂)), nowadays refers to the music composed for Chinese musical instruments, which is an extension of the Chinese traditional music.  It is often written for some form of grand presentation through a large Chinese orchestra, as well as performances with solo instruments.  It is frequently broadcast on radio and television in the People's Republic of China, and it is also the primary form of Chinese music taught in conservatories in China, as well as in Taiwan and Singapore.

Terms and definitions

Names
The term guoyue appeared in various ancient texts and had various different meanings before the 20th century.  It was used as early as the Sui-Tang period to refer to court music or yayue.  In the Music Record section of History of Liao, it was used to distinguish the music of the Khitan rulers from that of the Han Chinese.  During the Qing Dynasty it was used to refer to the kind of ceremonial court repertoire that was seen as a representation of China.

In the early 20th century, guoyue became a popular term used loosely to include all music written for Chinese instruments in response to a particular nationalistic consciousness.  Later, after Communist victory in 1949, a new term minyue, short for minzu yinyue (民族音乐) meaning national or people's music, was used in mainland China to encompass all compositions and genres for traditional instruments including music of ethnic minorities.  In Taiwan it continues to be known as guoyue, but in other Chinese communities, it may also be referred to as huayue (for example in Singapore and Malaysia) or zhongyue (in Hong Kong).

Usage of term
In the early 20th century, the term guoyue  was widely used to distinguish between imported Western music and traditional Chinese music. It therefore included all Han Chinese music but excluded anything written for Western instruments.  In its broadest sense it includes all Chinese instrumental music, opera, regional folk genres, and solo pieces.

Not everyone however agreed on its modern definition, and what constituted guoyue changed with time and locations.  Originally it only referred to the music of Han Chinese, later it also included the music of various ethnic minorities in China. Some argued that it should only refer to music of Confucian rituals (yayue) and the literati, while to others it included all Chinese forms of music as long as it is not European.  In the new Republic of China in Taiwan, Guoyue emphasized the traditional music of mainland China over the Taiwanese local traditions.

The guoyue that was envisioned in the early 20th century was not entirely traditional. To many, part of the idea was to reshape Chinese folk and art music fit for the modern age.  To composer Xian Xinghai, "traditional music should be improved by adding harmony and counterpoint", while to musician Zhao Feng the national music culture would be the combination of Chinese melodies and Western professional techniques.  Some also made a distinction between the regional music as performed by untrained folk musicians, i.e. the raw material from which guoyue is drawn, and the more polished national music.  In this view guoyue is therefore a polished, modernized form of traditional Chinese music.

Some forms of traditional music were also excluded at various times. In mainland China after 1949, folk music was promoted but classical Chinese music was also condemned as decadent and reactionary and became sidelined.  During the Cultural Revolution classical Chinese music virtually disappeared, and some only survived by being reworked in a "light" style. Much of what was taught and performed as classical music consisted of arrangement and recompositions of older repertory, however there have been more interest in the original classical repertory since the 1990s.

History

Origin
In the early part of the 20th century after the fall of the Qing Dynasty, Chinese intellectuals were interested in modernizing and revitalizing traditional Chinese music.  Cai Yuanpei, the president of Peking University and an important figure in the May Fourth Movement, proposed using certain aspects of Western music to compensate for the perceived weakness in Chinese music. As part of the New Culture Movement of the period, the guoyue music genre emerged to promote greater patriotism In the 1920s. Many groups in Shanghai associated themselves as "National Music Clubs"  such as the Great Unity National Music Club (大同國樂會) founded by Zheng Jinwen (鄭覲文).  Chinese regional music become incorporated into modern education institution, for example by Liu Tianhua at the Peking University. The Institute for the Improvement of Chinese Music (國樂改進社, Guóyuè Gǎijìnshè) and a periodical, the Music Magazine (音樂雜誌, Yīnyuè Zázhì), were founded. Liu Tianhua promoted what was then regional folk instruments such as erhu, adopted Western music techniques and methods of teaching for such instruments.  He composed music pieces for erhu and adopted violin playing techniques to the instrument.  He also formed the Society for Improving National Music he formed at Peking University in 1927. National identity and pride also became important during the Second Sino-Japanese War and the Chinese Civil War throughout the 1930s.

Development of modern Chinese orchestra (1930s-1960s)

The Chinese orchestra represents a significant force in the development of guoyue.  Although there were orchestras in ancient times, the Chinese orchestra that is now commonly found in China and overseas Chinese communities is a modern creation that gradually developed through a series of experimentation starting in the 1920s.  It is modeled on Western symphony orchestra but drawn initially from traditional sizhu   emsemble (sizhu, 絲竹, literally "silk and bamboo", are two traditional classifications for string and wind instruments). Among the major contributors to its development was Zheng Jinwen, who first experimented by increasing the number of player in a Jiangnan sizhu ensemble to 35, and separated the instruments into different sections.  He also started the process of standardization of the instruments, for example inventing method to resolve the problem of traditional instruments such as dizi where the fundamental tuning for various instruments may be different.  In the past each player may also embellish the parts at will, but in this new orchestra, Zheng wrote specific music for each instruments or sections. In Beijing, Liu Tianhua also formed a sizhu ensemble and wrote for the ensemble, expanding on traditional musical notation so it may be used for an orchestra, specifying ornamentation details and tempo and the use of particular instruments in specific sections.

In 1935, a music ensemble was formed at the Broadcasting Corporation of China (BCC) in Nanjing for the broadcasting of traditional Chinese music.  Due to the Sino-Japanese war, the ensemble later moved to Chongqing, where it held its first public performance in 1942.  The ensemble also held classes, and it quickly expanded with extra instruments added. It became known as the BCC Chinese Orchestra, often considered the first Chinese orchestra formed. The orchestra was organized along the line of a Western orchestra in a form that is recognizable today, with a conductor, full scores for musicians, and four different sections - wind, plucked strings, bowed strings, and percussion. The plucked strings section is unique to Chinese orchestra due to the large number of traditional Chinese lute-type instruments.

In 1953, the PRC government established its first Chinese orchestra, the Central Broadcasting Station Orchestra in Beijing, based on the early models.  The tuning of the instruments was shifted to the equal-tempered tuning system.  Further instruments were also added to enhance the sound and range of the orchestra.  New pieces based on regional music and other traditional Chinese music were composed for the orchestra.

By the 1960s, a largely standardized form of Chinese orchestra had emerged. The modern Chinese orchestra has since become a cultural institution in China as well as Chinese communities outside of mainland China.  Amateur Chinese orchestras are commonly found in Taiwan, Hong Kong, Singapore, Malaysia organized by clan associations, community centres and schools.  Professional Chinese orchestras include Shanghai Chinese Orchestra, China Central Chinese Orchestra, Hong Kong Chinese Orchestra, Singapore Chinese Orchestra and Taipei Chinese Orchestra.

1980s
In 1980 the Chinese Musicians' Association was formally elected to the "International Musicological Society". Chinese musical groups toured foreign countries, and foreign musical organizations performed in China. In the mid-1980s popular ballads, western folk and classical music still drew the greatest audiences, but other kinds of music, including previously banned western jazz and rock and roll, were being performed with greater acceptance especially among the youth.

2000s
Guoyue music made its comeback into mainstream popular music in the 2000s by Taiwanese composer Jay Chou and songwriter Vincent Fang, who coined the term Zhongguo Feng (中國風; lit. Chinese Wind) to describe the style of the album The Eight Dimensions which fuses modern rock and contemporary R&B together with traditional Chinese music.

Repertoire
Many of the early pieces composed were based on regional and traditional pieces. The early compositions may be written for a Jiangnan sizhu ensemble or other instruments, some may be developed later into orchestral composition.  A well-known orchestral piece is the Dance of the Yao People which was based on the folk music of the Yao minority.  It was originally written for a Western orchestra, but later also arranged as a Chinese orchestral piece.  Similarly other popular pieces such as Butterfly Lovers' Violin Concerto were also reworked for Chinese orchestra as a concerto piece for erhu or pipa.

Many solo pieces for various Chinese instrument have also composed, and these pieces may be performed solo or arranged with accompaniment by other instruments or a full orchestra.  Examples of these solo pieces are "Night Song of the Fisherman" (漁舟唱晚) which was composed for the guzheng in 1936 based on an old Shandong piece "Double Beat" (雙板), Dance of the Yi People composed for the pipa in 1965, and "The Moon Mirrored in the Erquan Pool" (二泉映月) composed for the erhu by Abing.  Many of these tunes have also been arranged for a Chinese orchestra, most notably by Peng Xiuwen.

Solo pieces
Some of these are traditional pieces, and new composition may also be based on older traditional tunes, although some are entirely original.  Many of these have also been arranged for larger orchestra.

Orchestral works

Earlier orchestral pieces

Modern compositions
The following are several examples of pieces written for large modern Chinese orchestra. These musical works utilise Western musical composition techniques, as well as the inclusion of Western instruments like cello, double bass, harp and Western percussion.

Guoyue performers

Conductors
Peng Xiuwen

See also
Guoyue (國樂)
Yayue (雅樂)
Nanguan music (南管)
Beiguan music (北管)
Taoist music
List of Chinese musical instruments
Chinese Cultural Renaissance
Musical nationalism
Historical Chinese anthems
Cultural Revolution

References

Beyond the May Fourth Paradigm by Kai-wing Chow

Chinese styles of music